The  Rwanda Mountain Gorilla Rally, known originally as the Fraternity Rally, is an international rally racing event organised by the Rwanda Automobile Club. The rally is based in the Rwandan capital of Kigali. The event is a round of the African Rally Championship and the Rwandan National Rally Championship.

The Fraternity Rally was first run in 1999 as motorsport re-established itself after the Rwandan Civil War. It began as a cross-border rally that began in Kampala, Uganda before finishing in Kigali. The rally became part of the African championship the following year, restoring a Rwandan presence to the African championship absent since 1988. Over time the Ugandan portion of the event faded and the rally was renamed the Rwanda Mountain Gorilla Rally 2002.

Burundi driver Rudy Cantanhede is the most successful driver in the rallies history with three wins to his credit. Italian born local driver Giancarlo Davite has two wins to his credit. All bar two events have been won by drivers of Subaru Imprezas.

List of winners
Sourced in part from:

References

External links
Official website
Rwanda Automobile Club 
African Rally Championship

Motorsport in Africa
Recurring sporting events established in 1999
1999 establishments in Rwanda
African Rally Championship
Rally competitions in Rwanda